Çifte Minareli Medrese, literally "Double Minaret Madrasah", is a former medrese located in Sivas, Turkey. It was built in 1271/2. It was commissioned by Şemseddin Cüveynî an Ilkhanid vizier.

References

Buildings and structures in Sivas
Buildings and structures completed in 1271
Madrasas in Turkey
Tourist attractions in Sivas
Seljuk architecture
World Heritage Tentative List for Turkey